Prionotalis is a genus of moths of the family Crambidae.

Species
Prionotalis africanellus (Strand, 1909)
Prionotalis balia (Tams, 1932)
Prionotalis friesei Bleszynski, 1963
Prionotalis peracutella Hampson, 1919

References

Natural History Museum Lepidoptera genus database

Crambinae
Crambidae genera
Taxa named by George Hampson